The Dodge EV concept car, also called Dodge Circuit EV sports car, was a two-passenger, rear-wheel-drive, all-electric sports car shown to the public at the 2009 North American International Auto Show by Dodge.

According to Dodge, the Dodge EV could be recharged in eight hours using a standard 120V outlet, or in only four hours using a 240V outlet, the type commonly used for electric ovens and dryers.

Dodge unveiled the working prototypes of this all-electric vehicle and announced plans to bring it to market in the United States by 2010.
But in May 2009 Autocar claimed the project was cancelled
and in November Fiat SpA disbanded Chrysler's ENVI electric car division and dropped its models from future product plans.

References

Electric concept cars
EV
Electric sports cars